MCC may refer to:

Aviation
 McClellan Airfield (IATA code MCC) in Sacramento, California
 Multi-crew cooperation, allowance to fly in a multi-pilot aircraft

Buildings
 Castellania (Valletta), a former courthouse and prison in Valletta, Malta
 Mediterranean Conference Centre, a conference centre in Valletta, Malta

Education

India
 Madras Christian College, located in Tambaram, Chennai, India
 Malabar Christian College, located in Calicut, Kerala State, India
 M. C. C. Higher Secondary School, Chennai, India
 Mulund College of Commerce, Mulund, India

United States
 Macomb Community College in Macomb County, Michigan
 Madisonville Community College in Madisonville, Kentucky
 Manchester Community College (Connecticut) in Manchester, Connecticut
 Manchester Community College (New Hampshire) in Manchester, New Hampshire
 Manatee Community College in Bradenton, Florida
 Maricopa County Community College District in Maricopa County, Arizona
 Massasoit Community College in Norfolk County, Massachusetts
 Maui Community College in Kahului, Maui, Hawaii
 McHenry County College in Crystal Lake, Illinois
 McLennan Community College in Waco, Texas
 Melbourne Central Catholic High School in Melbourne, Florida
 Meridian Community College in Meridian, Mississippi
 Mesa Community College in Mesa, Arizona
 Mesalands Community College in Tucumcari, New Mexico
 Metropolitan Community College (Missouri) in Kansas City, Missouri
 Michigan Christian College, now Rochester College, in Rochester Hills, Michigan
 Middlesex Community College (Massachusetts) in Lowell and Bedford, Massachusetts
 Middlesex Community College (Connecticut) in Middletown, Connecticut
 Middlesex County College in Edison, New Jersey
 Mitchell Community College in Statesville, North Carolina
 Mohave Community College in Kingman, Lake Havasu City, Colorado City and Bullhead City, Arizona
 Monroe Community College in Rochester, New York
 Mott Community College in Flint, Michigan
 Muskegon Community College in Muskegon, Michigan

Elsewhere
 Marian Catholic College, in Griffith, New South Wales, Australia
 Maritime Christian College, located in Charlottetown, Prince Edward Island, Canada
 Midlands Christian College located in Gweru, Zimbabwe
 Mirzapur Cadet College, in Bangladesh
 Montserrat Community College, in Salem, Montserrat
 Mathias Corvinus Collegium, in Budapest, Hungary

Organizations

Commercial 
 Banca del Mezzogiorno – MedioCredito Centrale, an Italian bank
 China Metallurgical Group Corporation, a state-owned enterprise in China engaged in metallurgy business
 Manhattan Construction Company, a division of Rooney Holdings Inc., owned by Francis Rooney
 MetaComCo, a software company
 Microelectronics and Computer Technology Corporation, an American R&D consortium active in the 1980s and 1990s
 Middelburgsche Commercie Compagnie, a former Dutch trading company involved in the Atlantic slave trade
 Mitsubishi Chemical Corporation
 Mondragón Cooperative Corporation, one of the world's largest worker cooperatives
 Municipal Code Corporation, a legal publishing company located in Tallahassee, Florida

Governmental 
 Mysore City Corporation, India
 Mangalore City Corporation, India
 Melbourne City Council, Australia
 Metropolitan Correctional Center, Chicago, United States
 Metropolitan Correctional Center, New York City, United States
 Metropolitan Correctional Center, San Diego, United States
 Metropolitan County Council in the United Kingdom
 Miaoli County Council, Taiwan
 Millennium Challenge Corporation, a U.S. government company which aims to reduce poverty through economic growth and investment

Not-for-profit 
 Birmingham Museum Collection Centre, UK
 Madison Community Cooperative, a Housing cooperative located in Madison, Wisconsin
 Massachusetts Consumers' Coalition, a consumer rights organization
 MCC Theater, an Off-Broadway theater company located in New York City
 Medical Cadet Corps, a Seventh-day Adventist Church program
 Medical Council of Canada, which regulates medical practitioners
 Midland Community Center
 Montana Conservation Corps, an AmeriCorps program
 Muslim Canadian Congress, a progressive Canadian Muslim organization

Political 
 Maendeleo Chap Chap Party, a Kenyan political party
 Majority Coalition Caucus, a power-sharing majority in the Washington State Senate
 Maoist Communist Centre of India, extremist faction
 Mouvement des Citoyens pour le Changement, a Belgian political party

Religious 
 Mennonite Central Committee, the relief and development agency of the Mennonite and Brethren in Christ Churches in North America
 Mennonite Church Canada
 Metropolitan Community Church, an international fellowship of Christian congregations that serve LGBT communities
 Mission Community Church, an American nondenominational church
 Missionary Society of the Methodist Church in Canada
 Muslim Canadian Congress
 Muslim Community Center, a mosque located in Chicago, Illinois
 Syro-Malankara Catholic Church, of India

Scientific 
 Microbial Culture Collection, Pune, India, a microbial culture collection centre
 Mercator Research Institute on Global Commons and Climate Change, a scientific institute based in Berlin, Germany

Science and technology

Biology and medicine
 3-Methylcrotonyl-CoA carboxylase deficiency, an inherited metabolic disorder
 MCC (gene), a candidate colorectal tumor suppressor gene
 Merkel cell carcinoma, a rare and aggressive cancer of the skin
 Microcrystalline cellulose
 Morbus cordis coronarius, the Latin name for Coronary artery disease
 Mucociliary clearance

Computing
 MCC Interim Linux, an early Linux distribution
 Memory chip controller, a digital circuit which manages the flow of data going to and from the computer's main memory
 Mobile cloud computing, cloud computing in combination with mobile devices
 Multiversion concurrency control, a computer science term
 Maximum clade credibility tree

Statistics and machine learning
 Matthews correlation coefficient, a metric to measure 2 x 2 confusion matrices

Technology
 Microcrystalline cellulose, excipient in pharmaceutical industry
 Mission control center, a facility that manages aerospace vehicle flights
 Mission Control Centre (Cospas-Sarsat), a clearinghouse for distress signals from distress radiobeacons
 Mobile country code, used in wireless telephone network station addressing
 Motor control center, an assembly of one or more enclosed sections having a common power bus and principally containing motor control units

Sports
 Madras Cricket Club in Chennai, India
 Manchester Canoe Club in Manchester, United Kingdom
 Marylebone Cricket Club, the home of cricket in the United Kingdom
 Melbourne Cricket Club in Melbourne, Australia
 Metro Catholic Conference, a high school athletic conference in St. Louis, Missouri
 Metropolitan Catholic Colleges Sports Association, an association of catholic schools in Sydney, Australia
 Michigan Collegiate Conference, former college athletic conference in Michigan
 Mid-Continent Conference, former name of the NCAA Summit League athletic conference
 Midwest Collegiate Conference, a National Association of Intercollegiate Athletics conference in Iowa and Wisconsin
 Midwestern Collegiate Conference, former name of the NCAA Horizon League athletic conference 
 Milwaukee City Conference, a high school athletic conference based in Milwaukee, Wisconsin

Correctional centers
 Menard Correctional Center near Menard, Illinois
 Metropolitan Correctional Center, Chicago Federal detention center in Chicago, Illinois
 Moberly Correctional Center in Moberly, Missouri

Other uses 
 1200 (MCC), in Roman numerals
 E = m × c × c, is the equation for mass-energy equivalence
 Halo: The Master Chief Collection, a collection of first-person shooter titles
 Merchant category code, assigned to companies accepting credit cards
 Mesoscale convective complex in meteorology
 Methode Cap Classique, a South African sparkling wine made by the traditional Champagne method
 Michelle Caruso-Cabrera, an American journalist and a former political candidate
 Micro Compact Car, a joint venture launched in 1995 between Mercedes Benz and Swatch; see Smart (automobile)
 Missile combat crew
 Montreal Comiccon, a comics convention in Montreal, Quebec, Canada
 Mortgage Credit Certificate, a program to provide tax credits for mortgage interest to first-time homebuyers in the United States
 Motorcycle club
 Moscow Central Circle, urban railway line in Moscow
 Municipal Code of Chicago, the codification of local ordinances of the City of Chicago

See also
 MC2 (disambiguation)